The Type 141 Seeadler-class fast attack craft differs from Type 140 Jaguar-class fast attack craft only in the installation of other, later more powerful diesel engine.

The Seeadler class was replaced in service with the Bundesmarine by the Type 143 Albatros class.

List of boats

See also 
 List of German Federal Navy ships
 List of naval ships of Germany

References
 Typ 141 Seeadler-Klasse @ Schnellboot.net (in German)

External links
 http://www.schnellboot-seeadler.de

Torpedo boat classes
Motor torpedo boats of the German Navy
Lürssen